Burn the World is the second album by the Swedish hardcore punk band AC4, released on Ny Våg (Ny Våg #133) in Sweden and Deathwish Inc. (DW145) in the United States, in March 2013.

The title track was written after guitarist Karl Backman's visit to the Chernobyl Nuclear Power Plant.

Track listing
All songs written by AC4.
 "Curva del Diablo"
 "Who's the Enemy"
 "All Talked Out"
 "Die Like a Dog"
 "Morality Match"
 "Bullet for Your Head"
 "Don't Belong"
 "Diplomacy Is Dead"
 "Burn the World"
 "Eye for an Eye"
 "I Won't Play Along"
 "Breakout" 
 "Extraordinary Rendition"
 "I Don't Want It - I Don't Need It"
 "Off the Hook"
 "Left You Behind"

Credits
 Dennis Lyxzén – vocals
 Karl Backman – guitar 
 Christoffer Röstlund Jonsson – bass
 Jens Nordén – drums
 Fredrik Lyxzén - recording at Parasit Studios
 Robert Hurula - artwork

Video
The official video for the track "Curva del Diablo" was filmed at a show at Verket in Umeå. It was directed by Robin Westman. A second video, for the title track "Burn the World," was released in May 2013. It was directed and animated by Jonathan Lindley.

References 

AC4 albums
2013 albums
Deathwish Inc. albums